Power Golf is a golf video game released by Hudson Soft for the TurboGrafx-16 on August 29, 1989 as one of the system's launch titles. It was part of the Power Sports Series, a series of sports games released between 1988 and 1998.

The game was released for the Wii Virtual Console on October 9, 2007 in Japan, on November 5, 2007, in North America, and on November 9, 2007 in Europe, and was released for the Windows Store on May 1, 2014 and for the Wii U Virtual Console on October 22, 2014 in Japan.

Played using primarily an overhead view of each hole, Power Golf features stroke and match play, and a competition mode that supports up to three players.

See also
Power Eleven
Power Sports

1989 video games
Golf video games
Hudson Soft games
TurboGrafx-16 games
Video games developed in Japan
Virtual Console games
Virtual Console games for Wii U
Windows games